Carlo Tullio Altan (30 March 1916 – 15 February 2005) was an Italian anthropologist, sociologist and philosopher. He was particularly known for his studies on the Italian national character, and was considered one of the pioneers of Italian cultural anthropology.

Altan was born at San Vito al Tagliamento, in Friuli. His son Francesco Tullio Altan is a popular comic books creator and satirist.

Selected bibliography
 Lo spirito religioso del mondo primitivo (1960)
 Antropologia funzionale (1968)
 Valori, classi sociali e scelte politiche (with Alberto Marradi 1976)
 Manuale di antropologia culturale: storia e metodo (1979)
 Modi di produzione e lotta di classe in Italia (with Roberto Cartocci, 1979)
 Antropologia, storia e problemi (1983)
 La nostra Italia (1986)
 Populismo e trasformismo (1989)
Soggetto, simbolo e valore: Per un'ermeneutica antropologica (1992)
Ethnos e Civiltà: Identità etniche e valori democratici  (1995)
La coscienza civile degli italiani: Valori e disvalori nella storia nazionale (1997)
Religioni, simboli, società: Sul fondamento umano dell'esperienza religiosa (with Marcello Massenzio, 1998)
Le grandi religioni a confronto:  L'età della globalizzazione (2002)

References

External links
Carlo Tullio Altan on WorldCat

1916 births
2005 deaths
People from San Vito al Tagliamento
Italian anthropologists
Italian sociologists
20th-century Italian philosophers
20th-century anthropologists